Harold Chadwick (25 January 1919 – 2 December 1987) was an English footballer, who played as a winger in the Football League for Tranmere Rovers.

References

External links

Tranmere Rovers F.C. players
Grimsby Town F.C. players
Macclesfield Town F.C. players
English Football League players
Association football wingers
1919 births
1987 deaths
English footballers